As was the custom since 1930, the 1952 Tour de France was contested by national and regional teams. The three major cycling countries in 1952, Italy, Belgium and France, each sent a team of 12 cyclists. Other countries sent teams of 8 cyclists: Switzerland, Luxembourg (together with Australia), Netherlands and Spain. The French regional cyclists were divided into four teams of 12 cyclists: Paris, North East–Center, South East and West–South West. The last team of eight cyclists was made up out of cyclists from the French North African colonies. In the end, Luxembourg only sent 6 cyclists, so all together this made 122 cyclists.

There were 57 French (of whom 6 were Algerian), 13 Italian, 12 Belgian, 8 Dutch, 8 Spanish, 8 Swiss, 5 Luxembourgian and 1 Australian cyclist. The winners of the last two editions, Swiss cyclists Hugo Koblet and Ferdinand Kübler, were injured and did not enter the race, neither did French cyclist Louison Bobet.

On the last press conference before the race, Jacques Goddet did a poll amongst journalists, to see who they considered the main favourite. Coppi received 29 votes in that poll, followed by Géminiani and Bartali, both 26 votes.

Start list

By team

By rider

By nationality

References

1952 Tour de France
1952